Southern Spaces is a peer-reviewed open-access academic journal that publishes articles, photo essays and images, presentations, and short videos about real and imagined spaces and places of the Southern United States and their connections to the wider world. The intended audience includes researchers and teachers, students in and out of classrooms, library patrons, and the general public.

A multimedia digital publication, Southern Spaces encourages the representation and analysis of many souths and southern regions, the critical scrutiny of any monolithic "South", the discovery of time-space relationships, and the mapping of expressive cultural forms associated with place. The journal covers areas such as geography, southern studies, regional studies, women's studies, queer studies, public health, and African American, Native American, and American studies.

Southern Spaces is published by the Emory Center for Digital Scholarship of Emory University in Georgia, United States.

External links
 
 Review
 Sarah Toton and Katherine Skinner. "A Space of Our Own: Bridging New Media and Traditional Scholarship with Southern Spaces in the Classroom" Journal of Online Teaching and Learning Fall 2006.
 Editors of Southern Spaces. ″Southern Spaces: A Partial History″. September 2017.

Area studies journals
Open access journals
English-language journals
Culture of the Southern United States
Publications established in 2004